Microbacterium aurum is a bacterium of the family Microbacteriaceae.

References

Further reading

External links

LPSN
Type strain of Microbacterium aurum at BacDive -  the Bacterial Diversity Metadatabase

aurum
Bacteria described in 1993